Sophronica bambusae is a species of beetle in the family Cerambycidae. It was described by Teocchi, Sudre and Jiroux in 2010.

References

Sophronica
Beetles described in 2010